Dimitris Dimakopoulos (alternate spelling: Dimitrios) (born January 28, 1966, in Thessaloniki, Greece) is a former Greek professional basketball player.

Professional career
Dimakopoulos started his career with Esperos Kallitheas. He moved to Panathinaikos. In 1992, he played with PAOK, with whom he won the Greek League championship, and he was also a FIBA Cup Winners' Cup finalist the same year. In 1993, he moved to Apollon Patras.

National team career
Dimakopoulos was also a member of the senior men's Greek national basketball team that finished in 10th place in the 1986 FIBA World Championship.

Personal life
Dimakopoulos' son, Ioannis Dimakopoulos, is also a professional basketball player, and he played with both the junior national teams of Greece, and also in NCAA Division I college basketball with the UC Irvine's Anteaters.

References

External links 
FIBA Profile
FIBA Europe Profile
Hellenic Basketball Federation Profile 

1966 births
Living people
Apollon Patras B.C. players
Esperos B.C. players
Greek Basket League players
Greek men's basketball players
Panathinaikos B.C. players
P.A.O.K. BC players
Power forwards (basketball)
Basketball players from Thessaloniki
1986 FIBA World Championship players